Salome Maswime is a South African clinician and global health expert. She is an Obstetrician and Gynaecologist and the Head of Global Surgery at the University of Cape Town. She advocates for women's health rights,  equity in surgical and maternal care, and providing adequate health services to remote and underserved populations.  She advises and consults for many institutions, including the World Health Organization. In 2017, she was honored with the Trailblazer and Young Achiever Award. She is a member of the Academy of Science of South Africa.

Early life and education 
Salome Maswime is from Limpopo. Her father was a theology professor at the University of Venda. She graduated in medicine from the University of KwaZulu-Natal in 2005. During her medical internship, she saw two mothers die in a maternity ward in Greytown, KwaZulu-Natal. This experience inspired her to train as a specialist obstetrician and gynecologist, as she feared she would "remain part of the problem that was leading to many preventable and unjust maternal deaths."

Maswime spent a decade at the University of the Witwatersrand in Johannesberg and at the Chris Hani Baragwanath Academic Hospital in Soweto. During this time, she realized she wanted to continue her formal education to understand the underlying causes of negative outcomes for mothers and neonates in childbirth.

She secured a PhD position supported by the Carnegie Corporation of New York and the South African Medical Research Council that allowed her to find ways to improve the lives of mothers and infants. She completed her Masters and PhD theses at the University of the Witwatersrand, where she looked to reduce maternal morbidity from caesarean section related haemorrhage across 15 hospitals in Gauteng.

Career 
Maswime is an executive member of the South African Perioperative Research Group. She is a member of the International Network of Obstetric Survey Systems. She was a lecturer and Director of the University of the Witwatersrand Obstetrics and Gynaecology Clinical Research Division and an obstetrician at the Chris Hani Baragwanath Hospital Academic Hospital. She works with women with high risk pregnancies. Her research considers maternal near miss and mortality. She found that maternal deaths from bleeding during caesarean sections have increased in South Africa. She compared the preparedness of hospitals for surgical complications in caesarean sections in southern Gauteng.

Maswime discovered that Africa accounts for 200,000 maternal deaths per year; which is two thirds of all maternal deaths worldwide. In 2017, she was named by the Mail & Guardian as one of the Top 200 South Africans. She has written for The Conversation about increasing the number of caesarean sections in Africa. She won the Trailblazer and Young Achiever Award from Jacob Zuma in 2017.

In 2018, she launched the South African Clinician Scientists Society, a collegial group for emerging specialists and researchers returning from training abroad that facilitates mentorship, networking, and multidisciplinary research. She was awarded a Discovery Foundation Harvard University, Massachusetts General Hospital Fellowship in 2018. Her fellowship allows her to research the causes of stillbirths in HIV-positive people. The fellowship is worth R2.1 million. During her postdoctoral year, Maswime found herself one of only two people at meetings at the World Health Organization or UNICEF.  She also worked on her approach to mental health as it relates to mothers and children.

In 2019 she was appointed as a Professor of Global Surgery at the University of Cape Town. In 2020, she was announced as one of the World Economic Forum's Class of 2020 Young Scientists, a group of 25 notable researchers who are "at the forefront of scientific discovery."

References 

South African obstetricians
21st-century South African physicians
South African women physicians
South African physicians
South African women academics
Living people
Year of birth missing (living people)
21st-century women physicians
South African gynaecologists
University of KwaZulu-Natal alumni
University of the Witwatersrand alumni
Academic staff of the University of Cape Town